Wild Mountain is a ski and snowboard area in Amador Township, Chisago County, near Taylors Falls, Minnesota. It features 26 runs, including 4 terrain parks, which include jumps, rails, boxes, quarter-pipes and half-pipes, which are both man made and natural. During the summer months of June, July and August, a water park, an alpine slide, and a go-kart track become operational. The site is also the first ski and snowboard resort in the Midwest to open every year, which is usually broadcast on the local news networks.

Geography
Wild Mountain is located one hour northeast of the Twin Cities Metropolitan area.  It is located 7 miles north of Taylors Falls. From North Branch you can take interstate 35. The resort lies on the western bank of the scenic St. Croix River and has many tall bluffs and hills next to its shores, some being 300–400 feet tall.

References
http://www.wildmountain.com/frequently-asked-questions#Two

External links
 Wild Mountain official website 
 Wild Mountain at Minnesota Downhill Ski Areas
 Hudson WI Patch article on St. Croix Valley ski history

Tourist attractions in Chisago County, Minnesota
Ski areas and resorts in Minnesota
Buildings and structures in Chisago County, Minnesota